The Abbott ministry (Liberal–National Coalition) was the 68th ministry of the Government of Australia. It succeeded the Second Rudd Ministry after a federal election that took place on 7 September 2013. It was led by Prime Minister, Tony Abbott.

Abbott announced his first ministry on 16 September 2013, and the ministry was sworn in by the Governor-General on 18 September. Abbott expressed regret at the low number of women in cabinet, but still received strong criticism on the lack of female representation in the ministry, including from members of his own party. Abbott added a second woman to his cabinet in Sussan Ley following a reshuffle announced on 21 December 2014, and sworn in on 23 December.

Following the defeat of Abbott by Malcolm Turnbull in the Liberal leadership spill of 14 September 2015, the ministry was replaced by the First Turnbull Ministry.

First Arrangement 
The initial arrangement of the Abbott ministry remained virtually unchanged from the initial swearing-in of the Cabinet on 18 September 2013 until the reshuffle that was announced on 23 December 2014.

Cabinet

Outer Ministry

Parliamentary Secretaries

Second Arrangement 
The second arrangement of the Abbott ministry was sworn in on 23 December 2014 following a reshuffle announced on 21 December.

Cabinet

Outer Ministry

Parliamentary Secretaries

Whips

House of Representatives

First Arrangement

Second Arrangement 
The whips of the House of Representatives were rearranged following Tony Abbott's sacking of Phillip Ruddock on 13 February 2015.

Senate

See also
Abbott Government

Notes 
a  Senator Arthur Sinodinos stepped down from his position as Assistant Treasurer on 19 March 2014 while his possible involvement in alleged corruption in New South Wales were being investigated by the Independent Commission Against Corruption. During this period, Sinodinos' duties were partially fulfilled by Minister for Finance, Mathias Cormann. Sinodinos officially resigned as Assistant Treasurer on 19 December 2014.
b  Malcolm Turnbull resigned as Minister for Communications on 14 September 2015 with the intent of challenging Tony Abbott for the leadership of the Liberal Party. In the ballot held later that evening, Turnbull was elected to the leadership.

References

Ministries of Elizabeth II
Abbott Government
Australian Commonwealth ministries
2013 establishments in Australia
2015 disestablishments in Australia
Liberal Party of Australia
National Party of Australia
History of Australia (1945–present)
Cabinets established in 2013
Cabinets disestablished in 2015
2010s in Australian politics